Howrah Municipal Corporation (abbreviated as HMC) is the local government of the city of Howrah, West Bengal, India. It is the second largest Municipal corporation and urban area in the state. This civic administrative body administers an area of  now.

History

Foundation

The introduction of the East India Railway in 1854 caused an influx of people in Howrah city. As a result, public nuisance and threat of epidemics  arose. So, the Howrah Offence Act was founded in 1857 to ensure prevention of local nuisances. The district magistrate was empowered to prosecute the law breaker with a fine of Rs 200 or rigorous imprisonment of one month. But nothing changed much. Ultimately, the Governor General vouched Section No. 12 of the Act of 1858, by which the Howrah Municipality was formed with the legislative council's due approval. However, the municipal committee was dissolved after a few years. In 1862, Howrah Municipality was reorganised.

On 2 May 1864, by the Municipal District Improvement Act III (1864), the Howrah Municipality Board was formed and from 2 August 1864 it started execution vide Gazette Notification. As per the Howrah Municipal Corporation Act of 1980, Howrah became a municipal corporation.

Bally Municipality
Bally Municipality was formed, separating it out from Howrah on 31 March 1883. In July 2015, Howrah Municipal Corporation  and Bally Municipality were merged. 35 wards of the Bally Municipality were decreased to 16 under the Howrah Municipal Corporation.

In November 2021, West Bengal Legislative Assembly passed a bill to separate Bally Municipality from Howrah Municipal Corporation.

Board of members

History
The first board comprised Mr E. C. Craster as the District Magistrate and chairman and Mr N. Macnicol as vice-chairman. The first board also comprised D. R. Bird as managing director, C. H. Denham as chief engineer, R. W. King, W Stalkartt, R. N. Barges, D W Campbell, Babu Gopal Lal Chowdhury, Babu Rajmohan Basu and Babu Kshetra Mohan Mitra as other members. The first board meeting was held on 6 May 1864. The first municipal election in Howrah took place on 1 December 1884 declaring the following commissioners from their respective wards.

Kedarnath Bhattacharya was the first Indian elected vice-chairman and chairman. In 1886, when Mr. E C Craster stepped down, Babu Upendra Chandra was elected as chairman and Baboo Kedarnath Bhattacharya was selected as vice-chairman. But due to some discrepancy in his election, Upendra Chandra's chairmanship was cancelled and Kedarnath Bhattacharya had to officiate in his position for a few years. After some years, nearly from 1890 the district magistrate was appointed as chairman up to 1916 when Babu Mahendranath Roy won the election with a huge majority.

Administration
The corporation area is divided into sixty six wards. Each ward elects a councillor and each borrow elects a chairman. The Mayor-in-council, which is led by Mayor and supported by Commissioner and officers, is responsible for administration of the corporation area.

Services 
The HMC is responsible for administrating and providing basic infrastructure to the city.
 Water purification and supply
 Sewage treatment and disposal
 Garbage disposal and street cleanliness
 Solid waste management
 Building and maintenance of roads, streets and flyovers.
 Street lighting
 Maintenance of parks and open spaces
 Cemeteries and Crematoriums
 Registering of births and deaths
 Conservation of heritage sites
 Disease control, including immunization
 Public municipal schools etc.

Elections

2013 election 
Elections to the 50 wards of Howrah Municipal Corporation were held on 22 November 2013. Trinamool Congress got the majority by winning 42 wards.

In October 2015, elections to 16 wards of newly merged Bally Municipality were held, with Trinamool Congress winning all 16 wards.

References

Organisations based in Howrah
Municipal corporations in West Bengal
1862 establishments in India